This is a list of notable Uzbek dishes and foods. Uzbek cuisine is the cuisine of Uzbekistan. The cuisine is influenced by local agriculture such as grain farming. Breads and noodles are a significant part of the cuisine, and Uzbek cuisine has been characterized as "noodle-rich". Mutton is a popular variety of meat due to the abundance of sheep in the country, and it is used in various Uzbek dishes. The ingredients used vary by season. For example, in the winter, dried abdimueed jamas, fruits and vegetables, noodles and preserves are prominent, while in the summer vegetables, fruits (particularly melon) and nuts are more prominent. Bread (nan, obi non) has a prominent role in Uzbek cuisine, and is influenced by pre-Islamic traditions. In Uzbek culture, elders are typically served food first, as a sign of respect towards them.

Uzbek dishes and foods
 Dimlama – An Uzbek stew prepared with various combinations of meat, potatoes, onions, vegetables, and sometimes fruits. Meat (mutton or beef) and vegetables are cut into large pieces and placed in layers in a tightly sealed pot to simmer slowly in their own juices.
 Meats include mutton, beef, poultry, goat meat, camel meat and horse meat (such as horse meat sausage)
 Melons (qovun), such as watermelon, are a prominent part of Uzbek cuisine. Qovun means "melon", and may refer to a melon that has an elongated shape, which has been described as "exceptionally sweet and succulent." Melons are often served as a dessert.
 Naryn – a pasta dish made with fresh hand-rolled noodles and horse meat.
 Noodle-based dishes
 Fried nuts and almonds
 Obi Non – also called patyr and nan, is a bread that is a staple food in Uzbek cuisine. It is formed into large discs and cooked. Tradition holds that the bread is always placed flat side up (rather than upside-down), and never cut with a knife. Non is a significant part of Uzbek cuisine, and is influenced by pre-Islamic traditions. It is typically prepared in tandir ovens. Styles of non can vary by region.
 Oshi toki – stuffed grape leaves
 Rice dishes 
 Shakarap – a salad prepared with tomato, onion, salt and pepper Some versions use a pumpkin filling during autumn.
 Sumalak – sweet paste made entirely from germinated wheat (young wheatgrass)
 Suzma – clotted milk that is strained, forming curds
 Tirit – prepared to avoid wasting dry bread, it is prepared with the broth of offals and cutting dry bread and adding ground pepper and onion.
 Yogurt soup – yogurt soup cooked with a variety of herbs, rice and sometimes chickpeas.

Beverages
 Green tea (kok choy) is typically served without sugar or milk, and is often consumed in teahouses, known as choyxonas.
 Soft drinks

Alcoholic beverages
 Beer
 Champagne
 Cognac
 Vodka – is the most popular alcoholic beverage, and is typically drunk straight (sans dilution or mixer).
 Wine

Desserts
 Candies
 Fresh or dried fruit
Melons 
 Halvah (lavz) – in Uzbekistan and Tajikistan, soft sesame halva is made from sugar syrup, egg whites, and sesame seeds. Solid sesame halva is made from pulled sugar, repeatedly stretched to give a white color, and prepared sesame is added to the warm sugar and formed on trays.

See also

 Agriculture in Uzbekistan
 Central Asian cuisine
 Kazan (cookware)
 Outline of Uzbekistan
 Soviet cuisine

References

External links
 

Lists of foods by nationality
Dishes